Abbasabad (also Romanized as ‘Abbāsābād) is a village in Gonbaki Rural District, Gonbaki District, Rigan County, Kerman Province, Iran. At the 2006 census, its population was 91, in 18 families.

References 

Populated places in Rigan County